Parallax Press is a nonprofit book publisher founded by the Vietnamese Thiền Buddhist monk Thích Nhất Hạnh. It is part of the Plum Village Community of Engaged Buddhism. Parallax Press publishes more than a hundred books by Thich Nhat Hanh and is also the publishing home of authors writing on mindfulness in daily life; contemplative practice; personal and collective healing; and activism for peace, the protection of the Earth, and social justice. Authors include Hanh, Chân Không, the 14th Dalai Lama, Joanna Macy, Sister Dang Nghiem, Marc Andrus, Pablo d'Ors, and Alberto Blanco. Since April 2016, Parallax Press books have been distributed by Penguin Random House Publisher Services.

Imprints
Parallax Press's publishing program includes the following three imprints.
 Palm Leaves Press: Sutra commentaries and scholarly books on aspects of Buddhist history
 Parallax Press: Books on "mindfulness in daily life"
 Plum Blossom Books: Books for children of all ages

References

 Book publishing companies based in the San Francisco Bay Area
 Book publishing companies based in Berkeley, California
 Publishing companies based in California
Publishing companies of the United States
Buddhist publishing companies
Buddhist websites
Book publishing companies of the United States
Book selling websites
Non-profit organizations based in California
American religious websites
Charities based in the United States
Publishing companies established in 1986
Religious organizations established in 1986